The Ural Electrochemical Combine is a company located in Novouralsk, Russia. It is a subsidiary of TVEL (Rosatom group). Beginning in 1949, the plant began the production of Highly Enriched Uranium (HEU).

History 
The Ural Electrochemical Combine was important to the Soviet Union due to its history of foreign partnerships. The facility was heavily involved in the construction of centrifuge plants in Shaan-xi and Lanzhou, China in the 1990s to serve China's domestic fuel needs. The facility also enriched uranium for Kazakhstan, with the Soviet Union receiving a share of 50%, proportionate to the need to enrich to 6000 tU/yr.

The Soviet Union began replacing its gaseous diffusion equipment with centrifuge technology in the 1960s. By the end of the Cold War, when all equipment had been replaced, the facility had the capacity to produce almost 12 million SWU per year.

The facility is now converted to civilian use and no longer produces highly enriched uranium. Today, the facility enriches uranium for Low-Enriched Uranium (LEU) fuel, and develops technologies for industrial applications. In the early 2000s it accounted for 49% of Russia's enrichment capacity.

References

External links
 Official website

Companies based in Sverdlovsk Oblast
Rosatom
Nuclear reprocessing sites
Manufacturing companies of the Soviet Union